Hope is the second EP of a trilogy released by American rock band Hawthorne Heights through the band's own record label, Cardboard Empire. Hope was released for digital download on June 5, 2012. It is also the second release by the band to contain a title track.

Track list

Personnel
Hawthorne Heights
JT Woodruff – Lead vocals, piano, rhythm guitar
Micah Carli – Lead guitar, screamed vocals
Matt Ridenour – Bass, backing vocals
Eron Bucciarelli – Drums, percussion

Additional musicians
Mark McMillon – backing vocals, group vocals
Chris "Poppy" Popadak" – group vocals
Mitch Vice – group vocals
Kevin Kirk – group vocals

References

Hawthorne Heights albums
2012 EPs